Fernando Rivas is a Cuban-American composer (Havana, Cuba 1952).
He graduated from the Juilliard School of Music where he studied with National Arts Award recipient David Diamond. He has worked extensively in film and theater, as well as in broadcast media and advertising. Mr. Rivas has won several awards including the Princess Grace Foundation Grant for outstanding original work in musical theater and composed fifteen musicals and hundreds of songs. His work was featured by the Theater Communications Group in a collaboration with Maria Irene Fornes and Tito Puente in Lovers and Keepers.

Rivas composed for the popular show Sesame Street for singers as diverse as Celia Cruz, Gloria Estefan and Cyndi Lauper sharing two Emmy award wins with the Music team in 1994 and 1995. He also received an Emmy nomination for Music Composition and Direction in 1997. He was the composer along with Lyricist Nancy Sans of the song Mambo I, I, I sung by Gloria Esteworm (a parody of Gloria Estefan, voiced by Ivy Austin) on the 1997 album Hot! Hot! Hot! Dance Songs, and later by Gloria Estefan on the Grammy Award winning best Children's Album 1999 - Elmopalooza!. In 1997, along with Luis Santeiro, he received the Richard Rodgers Development Award for the piece Barrio Babies, which was produced by the Denver Center Theatrical Company. Rivas also composed a musical, Selena, Forever, with author Eddie Gallardo, based on the tragic life of the renowned Tejano singer, which premiered in San Antonio in 2000.

His poetry and short fiction have been published on the Internet in several e-zines and he was a freelance contributor to the Charleston City Paper. From 2006-2010 he was the composer for the Emmy award nominated Disney Channel show Handy Manny. In 2010 he won two Imagin awards for Handy Manny and a special production for Nickolodeon. He was on the staff of the Fine Arts department at Porter-Gaud School in Charleston until 2009 as Jazz Band Director and has also collaborated with the Charleston Symphony Orchestra as arranger and pianist.

On Tuesday, April 19, 2011, the FBI and the North Charleston police raided Rivas' home in North Charleston, South Carolina, and found child pornography on his computer. In November 2011 he was released on house arrest on federal charges of production, transportation and possession of child pornography, coercing a child “to engage in sexually explicit conduct”. Rivas appeared in federal court on Monday, November 21 to dispute the charges of making and distributing child pornography, despite initially admitting to taking the pictures and emailing them to two other men when he was first taken into custody. On Thursday, December 6, 2012, he entered a guilty plea. On Tuesday, September 24, 2013, he was sentenced to the mandatory minimum sentence of 15 Years (180 Months) without parole in Federal Prison. He later appealed his sentence & conviction to the US Federal Appeals Court for the 4th Circuit. The aforementioned circuit court affirmed both his sentence and conviction on Tuesday, June 3, 2014. His motion to vacate (which was filed on Sunday, October 4, 2015) was denied on Wednesday, October 19, 2016. Rivas is currently incarcerated at FCI Seagoville.

References

Cuban composers
Male composers
Living people
Cuban pianists
21st-century pianists
Year of birth missing (living people)
Cuban male musicians